Skaði is a Scandinavian goddess.

Skadi may also refer to:

Places
 Skadi (moon), a moon of Saturn
 Skadi Mons, Maxwell Montes, Venus, a mountain

Other uses
 Skadi (rowing club), a rowing club from Rotterdam
 FV Skadi (1993–2011), a fish processing vessel
 Ruta Skadi, a character from Philip Pullman's His Dark Materials trilogy
 Skadi Walter (born 1964), German speed skater
 Skadi, a character in the video game Arknights

See also

 
 
 Skathi (disambiguation)
 Scad (disambiguation)
 Skade (Revelation Space), a character in Alastair Reynolds' Revelation Space novels including Redemption Ark